= Tangrian =

- Location within Pakistan
- Coordinates: 30.48°N 74.11°E
- Country: Pakistan
- Province: Punjab
- Elevation: 181 m (594 ft)
- Time zone: UTC+5 (PST)

Tangrian is a village in the Punjab province of Pakistan. It is located at 30°48'10N 74°11'5E with an altitude of 181 metres (597 feet).
